The Central District of Bampur County is a district (bakhsh) in Bampur County, Sistan and Baluchestan province, Iran. At the 2006 census, its population was 47,360, in 9,148 families.  The district has one city: Bampur. The district has two rural districts (dehestan): Bampur-e Gharbi Rural District and Bampur-e Sharqi Rural District.

References 

Bampur County
Districts of Sistan and Baluchestan Province